The 2009 Puskás Cup was the second edition of the Puskás Cup and took place 2 April to 5 April. Ferencvárosi TC were the defending champions. Ferencvárosi TC won their first title by defeating Budapest Honvéd FC 2–1 in the final.

Participating teams
 ŠK Slovan Bratislava (invited)
 Budapest Honvéd FC (former club of Ferenc Puskás)
 Ferencvárosi TC (invited)
 Panathinaikos F.C. (former club of Ferenc Puskás)
 Puskás Academy (host)
 Real Madrid C.F. (former club of Ferenc Puskás)

Venues
Stadion Sóstói
Felcsút

Results

5th place

3rd place

Final

References

External links
Official website

2009
2008–09 in Spanish football
2008–09 in Hungarian football
2008–09 in Greek football
2008–09 in Slovak football